Herman Matthews (born December 28, 1960 in Houston, Texas) is an American drummer and composer. Matthews works as a session and touring musician, most notably for Tower of Power, Kenny Loggins and toured with Tom Jones for more than 7 years. He began playing drums at the age of seven and has been the backbone of world-class pop, rock, jazz, soul, R&B and funk bands for nearly thirty years.

Career 
Matthews has worked with such artists as Stevie Wonder, Celine Dion, Elton John, Sheryl Crow, Herbie Hancock, Carole King, John Mayall, Spencer Davis, Edgar Winter, Luther Vandross, Rebekah, Bob James, Bobby Kimball, KINA, George Duke, Kirk Whalum, Eric Burdon & The Animals, David Foster, Michael McDonald, Michael Bolton, Patti Austin, Teresa James & the Rhythm Tramps, Robin Thicke, Angela Winbush, The Isley Brothers, Bonnie Raitt, Taj Mahal and Richard Marx. Matthews' work appears on movie and television soundtracks, he was a house-band member for the hit television show, In Living Color.

Matthews released his first solo CD Home At Last in 2007. The title track was featured in an episode of the Fox Broadcasting Company  crime/drama K-VILLE starring Anthony Anderson and Cole Hauser.

Matthews replaced drummer, Jay Bellerose (Elton John, Bonnie Raitt), for the Hugh Laurie, 2013 - 2014, World Tour. Matthews' first gig with the Copper Bottom Band was for the PBS,  "Live On The Queen Mary", broadcast on August 3, 2013. Laurie's 2013 album, Didn't It Rain, peaked Billboard Magazine's, Billboard 200 at #21 and was #1 on Billboard's Top Blues Albums.

Solo albums

Home At Last (2007) 

 Recorded at: Ned's Studio Los Angeles, CA

 Mastering by: Simon Rhodes at Abbey Road Studios

 Dedicated to: Clifton "Red" Matthews and  Herman Leslie Matthews Jr.

Primary vocalists 
 Herman Matthews -Vocals primary
 Teresa James -  Vocal Ad-Libs, Vocal Harmony
 Kim Yarbrough - Vocal Ad-Libs
The Hermanators
 Ned Albright - Vocals (Background)
 Gia Ciambotti -  Vocals (Background)
 Ben Jaffe  -  Vocals (Background)
 Kim Yarbrough - Vocals (Background)

Composers
 Ned Albright
 Eddie Holland
 Shorty Long
 Herman Matthews
 Phil Settle

Production
 Ned Albright -  Producer
 Bob-A-Lew Songs - Administration (ASCAP)
 Gardner Knight - Engineer and mixing 
 Orit Harpaz  - Photography
 Herman Matthews -  Producer 
 Todd Miller -  Engineer ("Cup Of Sugar")
 Christy Myhre - Design
 Simon Rhodes - Mastering

Musicians

Discography

Recording

Tour

References

External links 

 
 
 
 

1960 births
Living people
Musicians from Houston
American jazz composers
American male jazz composers
American session musicians
20th-century American drummers
American male drummers
Tower of Power members
Jazz musicians from Texas
20th-century American male musicians